Rif Dimashq Governorate (literally, the "Governorate of the Countryside of Damascus", Damascus Suburb) is one of the fourteen governorates (provinces) of Syria. It is situated in the southwestern part of the country. It borders the governorates of Quneitra, Daraa and al-Suwayda in the southwest, Homs in the north, Lebanon in the west and Jordan in the south. The capital is the city of Douma.

The Governorate completely surrounds the city and governorate of Damascus and it has an area of 18,032 km² and a population of 2,273,074 (2004 census).

The Governorate was a major site of fighting in the Syrian Civil War in the Rif Dimashq Governorate campaign.

Districts 

The governorate is divided into ten districts (manatiq). The districts are further divided into 37 sub-districts (nawahi). There were nine districts until February 2009, when Qudsaya District was created from parts of Markaz Rif Dimashq and Al-Zabadani districts. There is a small village belonging to the Damascus countryside (Ghouta) called Aqraba, which is characterized by its fields and agricultural orchards. (nawahi). The governorate's total population (as of the 2004 census) is 2,273,074.

 Markaz Rif Dimashq District (6 sub-districts; population: 837,804)
 Al-Kiswah Subdistrict
 Babbila Subdistrict
 Jaramana Subdistrict
 Al-Malihah Subdistrict
 Kafr Batna Subdistrict
 Arbin Subdistrict
 Darayya District (3 sub-districts; population: 260,961)
 Darayya Subdistrict
 Sahnaya Subdistrict
 al-Hajar al-Aswad Subdistrict
 Douma District (7 sub-districts; population: 433,719)
 Douma Subdistrict
 Harasta Subdistrict
 Al-Sabe' Biyar Subdistrict
 Al-Dumayr Subdistrict
 Al-Nashabiyah Subdistrict
 Al-Ghizlaniyah Subdistrict
 Harran al-Awamid Subdistrict
 An-Nabek District (3 sub-districts; population: 80,001)
 An-Nabek Subdistrict
 Deir Atiyah Subdistrict
 Qara Subdistrict

 Qatana District (3 sub-districts; population: 207,245)
 Qatana Subdistrict
 Beit Jen Subdistrict
 Sa'sa' Subdistrict
 Qudsaya District (3 sub-districts; population: 105,974)*
 Qudsaya Subdistrict
 Al-Dimas Subdistrict
 Ain al-Fijah Subdistrict
 Al-Qutayfah District (4 sub-districts; population: 119,283)
 Al-Qutayfah Subdistrict
 Jayroud Subdistrict
 Maaloula Subdistrict
 Ar-Ruhaybah Subdistrict
 Al-Tall District (3 sub-districts; population: 115,937)
 al-Tall Subdistrict
 Saidnaya Subdistrict
 Rankous Subdistrict
 Yabroud District (2 sub-districts; population: 48,370)
 Yabroud Subdistrict
 Assal al-Ward Subdistrict
 Al-Zabadani District (3 sub-districts; population: 63,780)
 Al-Zabadani Subdistrict
 Madaya Subdistrict
 Serghaya Subdistrict

*a newly-created district since 2009, formerly belonging to Markaz Rif Dimashq District and parts of Al-Zabadani District

References 

 
Governorates of Syria